Abdrakhmanovo is a rural locality (a selo) and the administrative center of Abdrakhmanovsky Selsoviet of Abdulinsky District, Orenburg Oblast, Russia. The population was 345 as of 2010. There are 6 streets.

Geography 
Abdrakhmanovo is located 45 km north of Abdulino (the district's administrative centre) by road. Nikolkino is the nearest rural locality.

References 

Rural localities in Orenburg Oblast